Jedermann (a German word, whose English meaning is "everyone" or "anyone" or "Everyman") may refer to:

Jedermann (play), a 1911 Austrian play by Hugo von Hofmannsthal
Jedermann (film), a 1961 film based on the Hofmannsthal play
Jedermann (Sibelius), 1916 incidental music by Jean Sibelius to the Hofmannsthal play

See also
Sechs Monologe aus Jedermann (Six monologues from Jedermann, 1943–44)), songs by Frank Martin
Everyman (disambiguation)